The Cape Cod Cubs were a professional ice hockey team that played at the Cape Cod Coliseum in South Yarmouth, Massachusetts.

The Cubs started play as an expansion franchise in the Eastern Hockey League in 1972, the same year their home arena, the Cape Cod Coliseum, was constructed. An affiliate of the National Hockey League's Boston Bruins, their general manager was Jack Crawford, a former All-Star defenceman with the Bruins, and they were coached by former Bruin Bronco Horvath. The Cubs won the EHL's Central Division championship in their first year of play. When the EHL folded, the Cubs became founding members of the North American Hockey League for the 1973–74 season.

References

External links
The Internet Hockey Database

1972 establishments in Massachusetts
Defunct ice hockey teams in the United States
Eastern Hockey League teams
Ice hockey clubs established in 1972
Ice hockey teams in Massachusetts
Sports in Barnstable County, Massachusetts
Yarmouth, Massachusetts
Boston Bruins minor league affiliates

de:Cape Cod Cubs
fr:Cubs du cap Cod